Lars Kristian Johnsen (born 28 August 1970) is a Norwegian former cyclist. He competed in the individual road race at the 1992 Summer Olympics.

References

External links
 

1970 births
Living people
Norwegian male cyclists
Olympic cyclists of Norway
Cyclists at the 1992 Summer Olympics
People from Eidsvoll
Sportspeople from Viken (county)